Kiki Bertens was the defending champion,  but chose to compete in Osaka instead.

Karolína Muchová won her first WTA Tour title, defeating Magda Linette in the final, 6–1, 6–1.

Seeds

Draw

Finals

Top half

Bottom half

Qualifying

Seeds

Qualifiers

Lucky loser
  Danka Kovinić

Draw

First qualifier

Second qualifier

Third qualifier

Fourth qualifier

Fifth qualifier

Sixth qualifier

References

External links
 Main draw
 Qualifying draw

Korea Open - Singles
2019 Singles
2019 Korea Open